Hajj Yusef (also Romanized as Ḩājj Yūsef, Ḩājj Yūsof, and Ḩāj Yūsef; also known as Hāji Yūsuf and Ḩājjī Yūsof) is a village in Hendudur Rural District, Sarband District, Shazand County, Markazi Province, Iran. At the 2006 census, its population was 86, in 24 families.

References 

Populated places in Shazand County